Bahram Rajabzade (born August 3, 1991) is an Azerbaijani kickboxer born in Iran. He is 3 times champion of Azerbaijan in 2009, 3 times champion of Iran and 8 times champion of super league (Iran and Turkey), WOF Open European and 2011 WOF heavyweight (91+) world champion in Antalya. He won second place in European Championship and he is an Azerbaijani honored coach.

Background and career
Bahram Rajabzadeh was born in 1991 in the city of Urmia in the West Azerbaijan Province. He started doing sports at the age of 7.

In 2016, he became the champion of Azerbaijan in kickboxing. He was invited to Azerbaijan in December 2015 at the invitation of the Orion Sports Club and currently represents Azerbaijan.

He married in 2016, and his wife is also an athlete. He has no children.

In 2019, Rajabzadeh signed with GLORY. He made his debut against Sergej Maslobojev at Glory 69: Düsseldorf. He lost the fight by unanimous decision.

Rajabzadeh faced karate standout Jan Soukup at XFN LEGENDS on March 29, 2019. He won the fight by a second-round knockout.

Rajabzadeh participated in the 2022 World Games, competing in the -91 kg kickboxing division. He captured the gold medal after beating both Roman Shcherbatiuk and Anto Širić by unanimous decision.

Fight record

|-  bgcolor="#cfc"
| 2022-07-02 || Win||align=left| Akhmat Mamadjanov || Loca Fight Club || Istanbul, Turkey || KO (High kick) || 1 ||1:06

|-  bgcolor="#cfc"
| 2022-04-30 || Win||align=left| Cengizhan Kuru|| Loca Fight Club || Istanbul, Turkey || TKO (retirement) || 2 ||3:00

|-  bgcolor="#cfc"
| 2021-08-27 || Win||align=left| Kilat Bilal Hallie || AVATAR COMBAT CUP || Turkey || TKO (Corner stoppage) || 1 ||

|-  bgcolor="#cfc"
| 2021-06-26 || Win||align=left| Mehmet Özer || Akin Dovus Arenasi || Istanbul, Turkey || TKO (Leg injury) || 2 || 2:00

|-  bgcolor="#fbb"
| 2019-10-12 || Loss||align=left| Sergej Maslobojev || Glory 69: Düsseldorf || Düsseldorf, Germany || Decision (Unanimous) || 3 || 3:00

|- bgcolor="#CCFFCC"
|2019-03-29 || Win || align=left|  Jan Soukup || XFN LEGENDS || Prague, Czech Republic || KO (Right cross) || 2 || 0:18

|- bgcolor="#CCFFCC"
|2018-03-11|| Win || align=left|  Mounir Hammoudi || Orion Fight Arena || Koblenz, Germany || TKO (Doctor stopapge) || 2 || 1:53

|- bgcolor="#CCFFCC"
|2017-10-21|| Win || align=left|  İbrahim Giydirir || Orion Fight Arena || Ankara, Turkey || TKO (Low kicks) || 1 ||

|- bgcolor="#CCFFCC"
|2016-09-25|| Win || align=left|  Bas Vorstenbosch || Fight Vision || Baku, Azerbaijan ||  || || 
|-
! style=background:white colspan=9 | 
|-
| colspan=9 | Legend:    

|-  bgcolor="#cfc"
| 2022-07-14 || Win||align=left| Anto Širić|| World Games 2022, Kickboxing Final +91 kg  || Birmingham, Alabama, United States || Decision (3:0) || 3 || 2:00
|-
! style=background:white colspan=9 | 

|-  bgcolor="#cfc"
| 2022-07-13 || Win||align=left| Roman Shcherbatiuk || World Games 2022, Kickboxing Semi Final +91 kg  || Birmingham, Alabama, United States || Decision (3:0) || 3 || 2:00

|-  bgcolor="#fbb"
| 2021-10- || Loss ||align=left| Roman Shcherbatiuk || W.A.K.O World Championships 2021, K-1 Quarter Final +91 kg  || Jesolo, Italy || Decision (2:1) || 3 || 2:00

|-  bgcolor="#cfc"
| 2021-10- || Win||align=left| Ariel Machado || W.A.K.O World Championships 2021, K-1 1/8 Final +91 kg  || Jesolo, Italy || Decision (3:0) || 3 || 2:00

|-  bgcolor="#fbb"
| 2018-10-20 || Loss ||align=left| Antonio Plazibat || W.A.K.O European Championships 2018, K-1 Final +91 kg  || Bratislava, Slovakia || Decision (2:1) || 3 || 2:00
|-
! style=background:white colspan=9 | 
|-
|-  bgcolor="#CCFFCC"
| 2018-10-19 || Win ||align=left| Roman Holovatuk || W.A.K.O European Championships 2018, K-1 Semi Finals +91 kg  || Bratislava, Slovakia || Decision (2:1) || 3 || 2:00
|-
|-  bgcolor="#CCFFCC"
| 2018-10-18 || Win ||align=left| Michal Blawdziewicz ||W.A.K.O European Championships 2018, K-1 Quarter Finals +91 kg  || Bratislava, Slovakia || Decision (3:0)|| 3 || 2:00

|-  bgcolor="#cfc"
| 2017-11-12 || Win||align=left| Michal Blawdziewicz || W.A.K.O World Championships 2017, K-1 Final +91 kg  || Budapest, Hungary || Decision (3:0) || 3 || 2:00
|-
! style=background:white colspan=9 | 

|-  bgcolor="#cfc"
| 2017-11-10 || Win||align=left| Nikola Filipovic || W.A.K.O World Championships 2017, K-1 Semi Final +91 kg  || Budapest, Hungary || Decision (2:1) || 3 || 2:00

|-  bgcolor="#cfc"
| 2017-11-08 || Win||align=left| Roman Holovatuk || W.A.K.O World Championships 2017, K-1 Quarter Final +91 kg  || Budapest, Hungary || Decision || 3 || 2:00

|-  bgcolor="#fbb"
| 2016-10-25 || Loss ||align=left| Saša Polugić || W.A.K.O European Championships 2016, K-1 Quarter Final +91 kg  || Maribor, Slovenia || Decision || 3 || 2:00

|-  bgcolor="#cfc"
| 2016-10-23 || Win||align=left| Jose Poteau || W.A.K.O European Championships 2016, K-1 Opening Round +91 kg  || Maribor, Slovenia || Decision || 3 || 2:00

|-
| colspan=9 | Legend:

References

External links 
  Bahram Rajabzade official Instagram account

Living people
1981 births
People from Urmia
Competitors at the 2022 World Games
World Games gold medalists
20th-century Azerbaijani people
21st-century Azerbaijani people
Azerbaijani male kickboxers